The Mayor of San Ildefonso, Bulacan is the head of government in San Ildefonso, Bulacan.

Mayor

Vice Mayor

References

Mayors of places in Bulacan